Richard Lyon may refer to:

Richard E. Lyon (1913–2002), illustrator and artist
Richard F. Lyon (judge) (1819–1894), supreme court justice of Georgia during the Confederacy
Richard F. Lyon (born 1952), one of the two people who independently invented the first optical mouse devices, co-founder of Foveon
Richard H. Lyon, engineering professor emeritus at MIT and founder of the RH Lyon Corp, for president of the Acoustical Society of America
Richard S. Lyon (1924–1976), American football player and coach in the United States
Richard Lyon-Dalberg-Acton, 4th Baron Acton (1941–2010), British Labour politician who became Baron Acton, of Aldenham in the County of Shropshire
Rick Lyon (born 1958), puppeteer who created the puppets for Avenue Q
Dick Lyon (rower) (born 1939), Stanford University Olympic rowing medalist at the 1964 Tokyo games
Richard Lyon (naval officer) (1923–2017), US Navy admiral and mayor of Oceanside, California
Lyon & Lyon, a law firm whose members at various times included Richard D. Lyon, Richard E. Lyon, and Richard F. Lyon

See also 
Richard Lyons (disambiguation)